Ray Ilott (11 January 1948  - 27 November 2016), was an Australian former association footballer.

Playing career

Club career
Ilott was briefly on the books of Football League Division Two team Leyton Orient before playing for a number of English non-league teams. Between 1968 and 1970 he played 40 times for Cheshunt before announcing he was emigrating to Australia.

After arriving in Australia in 1970, Ilott played for Ascot in the Western Australia State League.

State career
Ilott played 32 times for Western Australia.

International career
Ilott played four full international matches for Australia in 1975, all against the USSR.

Honours

Player
 Rothmans Gold Medal - Best and Fairest in State League: 1974
 Football Hall of Fame Western Australia Hall of Champions Inductee: 1996

Ascot
 Western Australia State League League Champion: 1974
 Western Australia State League Night Series Champion: 1974

Forrestfield United
 Western Australia State League Top Four Champion: 1981

Manager
Forrestfield United
 Western Australia State League Top Four Champion: 1981

Stirling Macedonia
 Western Australia State League League Champion: 1987
 Western Australia State League Night Series Champion: 1988

References

1948 births
Footballers from Greater London
Cheshunt F.C. players
Australian soccer players
Australia international soccer players
2016 deaths
Association football forwards
Floreat Athena FC players
Wanneroo City SC players